Iryna Petrivna Fedyshyn (born in Lviv) is a Ukrainian singer and songwriter.

Biography
Iryna Fedyshyn was born on 1 February 1987 in Lviv, Ukrainian SSR, in the family of a musician. From an early age, she showed musical, vocal and stage abilities.

At the age of six, the future singer tried herself as a presenter. Her father, although a musician, never considered music a serious profession, and dreamed that the child would be engaged in chess. The first musical instrument of the future singer was a synthesizer, on which, quickly learning to improvise, Irina began to write her first songs.

At the age of thirteen, the girl decided to get a musical education and went to study at a music school. Thanks to her home education, she was immediately accepted into the fourth grade of the music school, from which she graduated with honors. There she also conducted concert programs. She studied economics at the Ivan Franko National University of Lviv and at the same time took private music and vocal lessons.

She participated in youth music competitions and festivals, where she won prizes. Some songs were included in the rotation on Ukrainian radio stations. In 2005, she performed in the semi-final of the Ukrainian national selection for the Eurovision Song Contest, and in 2006 and in 2009 she performed in the concert program "Schlager of the Year". In 2015 Iryna Fedyshyn won the Ukrainian-language song contest "Ukrainian Format" with the song "Sertsia stuk".

In 2016, she performed concerts in Ukraine, visited several dozen cities. On 4 November 2016, in Kyiv, in the October Palace, her solo concert "Tsvite Kalina" took place.

In 2018, she took part in the eighth season of the TV show "The Voice of Ukraine".

In 2020, Iryna Fedyshyn and her husband fell ill with coronavirus, this became known after her recovery. In September 2020, she presented the song "Tam de ti", which entered the top ten most popular hits on radio stations in Kyiv and Ukraine, and the music video for it gained more than a million views on YouTube. Later that year, the singer released several Christmas-themed songs.

Since January 2021, the singer took part in the project The Masked Singer Ukraine on the TV channel "Ukraine", but dropped out in the fourth episode. On 2 March, Fedyshyn presented the author song "Obiimi".

Personal life
Fedyshyn lives in Lviv. Married to producer Vitalii Chovnyk. They have two sons: Yura and Oleh.

Discography

 Studio albums
 Tvii anhel (2007)
 Ukraina kolyaduie (2007)
 Parol (2012)
 Ukraina kolyaduie. Nove (2013)
 Tsvite kalyna (2015)
 Ty tilke mii (2018)

Awards and nominations

References

External links
  

1987 births
Living people
21st-century Ukrainian women singers
Ukrainian pop singers
Ukrainian folk singers
Musicians from Lviv